The 2019 NHL Heritage Classic (branded as the 2019 Tim Hortons NHL Heritage Classic for sponsorship reasons) was an outdoor regular season National Hockey League (NHL) game. The game, the fifth Heritage Classic, was held on October 26, 2019. The Winnipeg Jets defeated the Calgary Flames, 2–1, at Mosaic Stadium in Regina, Saskatchewan—the home field of the Canadian Football League's Saskatchewan Roughriders.

Background
This was the first NHL regular season outdoor game that was held in a neutral site territory that is not formally part of an NHL market, the first regular season game held in Regina, and the first regular season game held in Saskatchewan since 1994. Notably however it was not the first major professional regular season hockey game in the Queen City since historically, Regina had been the home of the defunct Western Canada Hockey League's Regina Capitals, who moved to Portland, Oregon in 1925. Regina is located roughly half-way between Calgary and Winnipeg. The Jets were designated as the home team. This was also the second outdoor game for each team; the Flames and Jets respectively hosted the 2011 and 2016 Heritage Classic games at their cities' respective CFL stadiums.

To accommodate the game, the CFL scheduled a three week road trip for the Riders near the end of the 2019 CFL season. Saskatchewan played its penultimate home game on October 5, followed by three road games while its stadium was converted to an outdoor hockey rink and back again. The Riders returned to Mosaic Stadium on November 2 for their final 2019 regular season game.

Game summary
Bryan Little scored at 3:04 of overtime to give the Jets the 2–1 win. The Flames' Elias Lindholm opened the scoring on a power play at 14:47 of the second period. Winnipeg's Josh Morrissey then tied the game on a power play at 15:49 of the third period.

At 19:58 of the second period, the Jets' Adam Lowry was given a minor penalty for boarding the Flames' Oliver Kylington. The league later gave Lowry a two-game suspension as a repeat offender.

Number in parenthesis represents the player's total in goals or assists to that point of the season

Team rosters

Scratches – Did not play
Calgary Flames: Michael Stone, Mark Jankowski

Winnipeg Jets: Luca Sbisa, Ville Heinola, Mason Appleton

Officials

Referee: Brad Meier, Graham Skilliter

Linesmen: Kiel Murchison, Trent Knorr

Entertainment
The Hunter Brothers sang the national anthem, The Sheepdogs performed during the first intermission, and Jess Moskaluke sang during the second intermission.

Television
This game aired as the late 10 p.m. EDT (8 p.m. local time) game on Hockey Night in Canada. In the U.S., NBCSN simulcast the HNIC feed; it was the second game of a rare Saturday night doubleheader on NBCSN that followed a 2019 Stanley Cup Finals rematch between the St. Louis Blues and the Boston Bruins.

Festivities 
The Western Hockey League's Regina Pats (who play at nearby Brandt Centre) hosted a "Prairie Classic" outdoor game against the Calgary Hitmen on October 27. Calgary won the game 5-4 in overtime.

References

External links
 

2019
Heritage Classic
Calgary Flames games
Heritage Classic
Heritage Classic
Heritage Classic
Ice hockey competitions in Regina, Saskatchewan